The Igan River is a river in Sarawak, Malaysia. It joins the Sungai Rajang in Sibu. The river is still used as the primary method of travel to a number of rural districts in Sarawak.

See also
 List of rivers of Malaysia

References

Rivers of Sarawak